Events from the year 1864 in the United States.

Incumbents

Federal Government 
 President: Abraham Lincoln (R-Illinois)
 Vice President: Hannibal Hamlin (R-Maine)
 Chief Justice: Roger B. Taney (Maryland) (until October 12), Salmon P. Chase (Ohio) (starting December 15)
 Speaker of the House of Representatives: Schuyler Colfax (R-Indiana)
 Congress: 38th

Events

January
 January – Long Walk of the Navajo: Bands of Navajo led by the U.S. Army are relocated from their traditional lands in eastern Arizona Territory and western New Mexico Territory to Fort Sumner in the Pecos River valley. At least 200 died along the  trek that took over 18 days to travel on foot.
 January 13 – Songwriter Stephen Foster ("Oh! Susanna", "Old Folks at Home") dies aged 37 in New York City leaving a scrap of paper reading "Dear friends and gentle hearts". His parlor song "Beautiful Dreamer" is published in March.

February
 February – Lewiston–Queenston Suspension Bridge on the Niagara River collapses in a gale.
 February 9 –  American Civil War: Libby Prison escape – 109 Union soldiers escape from the Confederate prison in Richmond, Virginia, 59 making it back to their home territory.
 February 20 – American Civil War: The Union suffers one of its costliest defeats at the Battle of Olustee near Lake City, Florida.
 February 25 – American Civil War: The first Northern prisoners arrive at the Confederate prison at Andersonville, Georgia (the 500 prisoners had left Richmond, Virginia, 7 days before).

March

 March 9 – American Civil War: President Abraham Lincoln appoints Ulysses S. Grant commander in chief of all Union armies.
 March 10 – American Civil War: The Red River Campaign begins as Union troops reach Alexandria, Louisiana.

April
 April 22 – The U.S. Congress passes the Coinage Act of 1864 which mandates that the inscription "In God We Trust" be placed on all coins minted as United States currency.

May
 May – Man and Nature: or, Physical geography as modified by human action by George Perkins Marsh is published. One of the first works to document the effects of human action on the environment and it helped to launch the modern conservation movement.
 May 5 – American Civil War: The Battle of the Wilderness begins in Spotsylvania County, Virginia.
 May 7 –  American Civil War: The Army of the Potomac, under General Ulysses S. Grant, breaks off from the Battle of the Wilderness and moves southwards.
 May 8–21 – American Civil War – Battle of Spotsylvania Court House: Some 4,000 die in an inconclusive engagement.
 May 11 – American Civil War – Battle of Yellow Tavern: Confederate General J. E. B. Stuart is mortally wounded at Yellow Tavern, Virginia.
 May 12 – American Civil War – Battle of Spotsylvania Court House: The "Bloody Angle" – thousands of Union and Confederate soldiers die.
 May 13 – American Civil War – Battle of Resaca: The battle begins with Union General Sherman fighting toward Atlanta.
 May 18 – Civil War gold hoax: The New York World and the New York Journal of Commerce publish a fake proclamation that President Abraham Lincoln has issued a draft of 400,000 more soldiers.
 May 20 – American Civil War – Battle of Ware Bottom Church: In the Virginia Bermuda Hundred Campaign, 10,000 troops fight in this Confederate victory.
 May 26 – Montana Territory is organized out of parts of Washington Territory and Dakota Territory, and is signed into law by President Abraham Lincoln.

June
 June 5 – American Civil War – Battle of Piedmont: Union forces under General David Hunter defeat a Confederate army at Piedmont, Augusta County, Virginia, taking nearly 1,000 prisoners.
 June 9 – American Civil War – The Siege of Petersburg begins. Union forces under General Grant and troops led by Confederate General Robert E. Lee battle for the last time.
 June 10
 American Civil War: Battle of Noonday Creek near Kennesaw, Georgia.
 American Civil War – Battle of Brice's Crossroads: Confederate troops under Nathan Bedford Forrest defeat a much larger Union force led by General Samuel D. Sturgis in Mississippi.
 June 12 – American Civil War – Battle of Cold Harbor: General Ulysses S. Grant pulls his troops from their positions at Cold Harbor, Virginia and moves south.
 June 15 – Arlington National Cemetery is established when 200 acres (0.8 km²) of the grounds of Robert E. Lee's home Arlington House are officially set-aside as a military cemetery by U.S. Secretary of War Edwin M. Stanton.
 June 27 – American Civil War: Battle of Kennesaw Mountain near Kennesaw, Georgia.
 June 30 – President Abraham Lincoln signs the Yosemite Grant Act, precursor to Yosemite National Park.

July
 July – President Abraham Lincoln signs a law that abolishes the commutation fee that could be paid to in lieu of conscription.
 July 20 – American Civil War – Battle of Peachtree Creek: Near Atlanta, Georgia, Confederate forces led by General John Bell Hood unsuccessfully attack Union troops under General William T. Sherman.
 July 22 – American Civil War – Battle of Atlanta: Outside of Atlanta, Georgia, Confederate General Hood leads an unsuccessful attack on Union troops under General Sherman on Bald Hill.
 July 24 – American Civil War – Battle of Kernstown: Confederate General Jubal Early defeats Union troops led by General George Crook in an effort to keep the Yankees out of the Shenandoah Valley.
 July 28 – American Civil War – Battle of Ezra Church: Confederate troops led by General Hood make a third unsuccessful attempt to drive Union forces under General Sherman from Atlanta, Georgia.
 July 30 – American Civil War – Battle of the Crater: Union forces attempt to break Confederate lines by exploding a large bomb under their trenches.

August
 August 1 – The Elgin Watch Company is founded in Elgin, Illinois.
 August 5 – American Civil War – Battle of Mobile Bay: At Mobile Bay near Mobile, Alabama, Admiral David Farragut leads a Union flotilla through Confederate defenses and seals one of the last major Southern ports.
 August 18 – American Civil War – Battle of Globe Tavern: Forces under Union General Ulysses S. Grant try to cut a vital Confederate supply-line into Petersburg, Virginia, by attacking the Wilmington and Weldon Railroad, forcing the Confederates to use wagons.
 August 31 – American Civil War: Union forces led by General William T. Sherman launch an assault on Atlanta, Georgia.

September
 September 1 – American Civil War: Confederate General Hood evacuates Atlanta after a 4-month siege mounted by Union General Sherman.
 September 2 – American Civil War: Union forces under General Sherman enter Atlanta a day after the Confederate defenders fled the city.
 September 8 – American Civil War: Atlanta, Georgia is evacuated on orders of Union General William Tecumseh Sherman.

October
 October 2 – American Civil War – Battle of Saltville: Union forces  attack Saltville, Virginia but are defeated by Confederate troops.
 October 9 –  American Civil War – Battle of Tom's Brook: Union cavalrymen in the Shenandoah Valley defeat Confederate forces at Tom's Brook, Virginia.
 October 15 –  American Civil War – Battle of Glasgow, Missouri: Confederate forces take the town.
 October 19 –  American Civil War – Battle of Cedar Creek: Union forces under Philip Sheridan defeat a surprise Confederate attack although incurring nearly twice as many casualties, ending the Shenandoah Valley Campaigns of 1864.
 October 25 – American Civil War – Battle of Mine Creek: the second largest cavalry engagement of the war, two divisions of Major General Sterling Price's Army of Missouri are routed by two Federal brigades under the command of Colonels Frederick Benteen and John Finis Philips.
 October 28 – American Civil War
 Second Battle of Fair Oaks: Union forces under General Ulysses S. Grant withdraw from Fair Oaks, Virginia, after failing to breach the Confederate defenses around Richmond, Virginia.
 Second Battle of Newtonia: Union forces defeat the remnants of Price's Missouri Expedition.
 October 30 – Helena, Montana is founded after four prospectors (the so-called Four Georgians) discover gold at Last Chance Gulch; it is their last and agreed final attempt at weeks of trying to find gold in the northern Rockies.
 October 31 – Nevada is admitted as the 36th U.S. state (see History of Nevada).

November

 November 4 – American Civil War – Battle of Johnsonville: At Johnsonville, Tennessee, troops under the command of Confederate General Nathan Bedford Forrest bombard a Union supply base with artillery and destroy millions of dollars in material.
 November 7 – The capital of Idaho Territory is moved from Lewiston to Boise; North Idaho declares the move illegal and proposes secession.
 November 8 – U.S. presidential election, 1864: Abraham Lincoln is reelected in an overwhelming victory over George B. McClellan.
 November 15 – American Civil War – Sherman's March to the Sea begins: Union General Sherman burns Atlanta and starts to move south, causing extensive devastation to crops and mills and living off the land.
 November 22 – American Civil War – Sherman's March to the Sea: Confederate General John Bell Hood invades Tennessee in an unsuccessful attempt to draw Union General Sherman from Georgia.
 November 25 – American Civil War: A group of Confederate operatives calling themselves the Confederate Army of Manhattan starts fires in more than 20 locations in an unsuccessful attempt to burn down New York City.
 November 29 – Indian Wars – Sand Creek Massacre: Colorado volunteers led by Colonel John Chivington massacre at least 400 Cheyenne and Arapahoe noncombatants at Sand Creek, Colorado (where they had been given permission to camp).
 November 30 – American Civil War – Second Battle of Franklin: The Army of Tennessee led by General Hood mounts a dramatically unsuccessful frontal assault on Union positions around Franklin, Tennessee (Hood loses 6 generals and almost a third of his troops).

December
 December 4 – American Civil War – Sherman's March to the Sea: At Waynesboro, Georgia, forces under Union General Judson Kilpatrick prevent troops led by Confederate General Joseph Wheeler from interfering with Union General Sherman's campaign of destroying a wide swath of the South on his march to Savannah, Georgia (Union forces suffer more than 3 times the casualties as the Confederates, however).
 December 15–16 – American Civil War – Battle of Nashville: Union forces decisively defeat the Confederate Army of Tennessee.
 December 21 – American Civil War – Sherman's March to the Sea: The campaign ends as Major General William Tecumseh Sherman captures the port of Savannah, Georgia.

Undated
 Asa Mercer travels from Seattle to the U.S. East Coast and recruits 11 Mercer Girls, potential wives for men on the West Coast.
 Robert Lowry writes the gospel hymn "Shall We Gather at the River?".

Ongoing
 American Civil War (1861–1865)

Births

January to June
 January 9 – Alvah Curtis Roebuck, American businessman, co-founder of Sears, Roebuck (died 1948)
 January 10 – Annie Lowrie Alexander, physician and educator (died 1929)
 February 7 – Arthur Collins, singer who records many early songs (died 1933)
 March 2 – William Hall Milton, U.S. Senator from Florida from 1908 to 1909 (died 1942)
 March 19 – Charles Marion Russell, "cowboy artist" (died 1926)
 April 8 – Orelia Key Bell, poet (died 1959)
 April 16 – Rose Talbot Bullard, medical doctor and professor (died 1915)
 May 1 – Anna Jarvis, social activist (died 1948)
 May 15 – John E. Aldred, businessman (died 1945)
 May 19 – Carl Akeley, taxidermist, sculptor, biologist, conservationist, inventor and nature photographer (died 1926)

July to December
 July 8 – Frank B. Brandegee, U.S. Senator from Connecticut from 1905 to 1924 (died 1924)
 July 12 – George Washington Carver, African-American agricultural botanist (died 1943)
 July 13 – John Jacob Astor IV, businessman. (died 1912)
 July 21 – Frances Folsom Cleveland, First Lady of the United States as wife of Grover Cleveland (died 1947)
 August 17 – Robert F. Broussard, U.S. Senator from Louisiana from 1915 to 1918 (died 1918)
 October 1 – Emma Sheridan Fry, actress and playwright (died 1936)
 October 6 – Sarah Blizzard, labor activist (died 1955)
 October 10 – T. Frank Appleby, U.S. Congressman from New Jersey from 1921 to 1923 (died 1924)
 October 16 – Ben M. Williamson, U.S. Senator from Kentucky from 1930 to 1931 (died 1941)
 November 5
 Truman Handy Newberry, U.S. Senator from Michigan from 1919 to 1922 (died 1945)
 Jessie Ralph, actress (died 1944)
 November 8 – James Eli Watson, U.S. Senator from Indiana from 1916 to 1933 (died 1948)
 November 13 – James Cannon Jr., Methodist Episcopal Bishop and temperance movement leader (died 1944)
 November 23 – Henry Bourne Joy, business leader (died 1936)
 December 6 – William S. Hart, film actor, film director and writer (died 1946)
 December 12 – Paul Elmer More, critic and essayist (died 1937)
 December 14 – Frank Campeau, actor (died 1943)
 December 22 – John A. M. Adair, U.S. Representative from Indiana from 1907 to 1917 (died 1938)
 December 25 – Thomas Cahill, soccer coach (died 1951)
 December 27 – Peyton C. March, general (died 1955)
 December 31 – Robert Grant Aitken, astronomer (died 1951)

Full date unknown
 Kitty Cheatham, singer (died 1946)

Deaths

January to June
 January 1 – Solon Borland, United States Senator from Arkansas from 1848 till 1853. (b. 1808)
 January 2 – Lemuel J. Bowden, United States Senator from Virginia from 1863 till 1864. (b. 1815)
 January 7 – Caleb Blood Smith, journalist and politician in the Cabinet of Abraham Lincoln from 1862 to 1864 (born 1808)
 January 13 – Stephen Foster, songwriter (born 1826)
 January 31 – Hamilton Rowan Gamble, 16th Governor of Missouri from 1861 to 1864 (born 1798)
 February 19 – William Edwin Baldwin, Confederate brigadier general in the Civil War (born 1827)
 February 25 – Anna Harrison, wife of William Henry Harrison, First Lady of the United States (died 1775)
 March 2 – Ulric Dahlgren, colonel in the Union Army during the Civil War (born 1842)
 April 12 – Thomas Green, brigadier general in the Confederate States Army during the Civil War (born 1814)
 March 4 – John James Appleton, diplomat, died in France. (b. 1789)
 May 5 – 
 Alexander Hays, Union Army general killed in the Battle of the Wilderness (b. 1819)
 Leroy A. Stafford, Confederate brigadier general killed in the Battle of the Wilderness (born 1822)
 May 6 – Henry Livermore Abbott, major in the Union Army killed in the Battle of the Wilderness (born 1842)
 May 8 – James S. Wadsworth, Union Army general mortally wounded in the Battle of the Wilderness (b. 1807)
 May 9 – John Sedgwick, Union army general killed in the Battle of Spotsylvania Court House (b. 1813)
 May 10
 Thomas G. Stevenson, Union Army general killed in the Battle of Spotsylvania Court House (b. 183
 James Clay Rice, Union Army general killed in the Battle of Spotsylvania Court House (b. 1828)
 May 12 – J. E. B. Stuart, United States Army officer who later became a Confederate States Army general during the American Civil War (born 1833)
 May 13 – Junius Daniel, Confederate brigadier general killed in the Battle of Spotsylvania Court House (born 1828)
 May 19 – Nathaniel Hawthorne, Dark romantic novelist (born 1804)
 June 14- Confederate General Leonidas Polk is killed in the Battle of Pine mountain.

July to December
 July 22 – James B. McPherson, Union Army general killed in the Battle of Atlanta (b. 1828)
 August 5 – Griffin A. Stedman, colonel in the Union Army who was mortally wounded in the Battle of Petersburg (born 1838)
 September 4
 Henry Johnson, United States Senator from Louisiana from 1818 till 1824 and from 1844 till 1849. (b. 1783)
 Albert Smith White, United States Senator from Indiana from 1839 to 1845 (b. 1803)
 John Hunt Morgan, Confederate general in the American Civil War (born 1825)
 September 20 – Charles B. Mitchel, United States Senator from Arkansas from 1862 till 1864. (b. 1815)
 October 18 – Roger Brooke Taney, politician, lawyer and judge (b. 1777)
 November 30 – States Rights Gist, lawyer, a militia general in South Carolina, and a Confederate Army brigadier general (born 1831)
 December 31 – George M. Dallas, 11th Vice President of the United States from 1845 till 1849. (b. 1792)

See also
 Timeline of United States history (1860–1899)

Further reading

External links
 

 
1860s in the United States
United States
United States
Years of the 19th century in the United States